History of the American Frontier is a book by  Frederic L. Paxson originally published in 1924 by Houghton Mifflin which won the 1925 Pulitzer Prize for History.

References 

Pulitzer Prize for History-winning works
1924 non-fiction books
Houghton Mifflin books